Jørgen Bo Petersen (born 11 April 1970) is a Danish former cyclist.

Major results

1992
 2nd National Time Trial Championships
2000
 3rd Overall Tour de l'Oise
 6th Trophée des Grimpeurs
2001
 1st  National Team Time Trial Championships (with Jimmy Hansen and Michael Skelde)
 1st Overall Tour de Luxembourg
 1st Overall Sachsen Tour
1st Stage 4a (ITT)
 1st Stage 3 Paris–Corrèze
 2nd National Time Trial Championships
2002
 1st GP Triberg-Schwarzwald
 1st Stage 5 Circuit des Mines
 2nd Overall Tour de Normandie
 2nd Overall Sachsen Tour
 2nd Sparkassen Giro Bochum
 3rd Classique des Alpes
 6th Overall Tour de Luxembourg
 6th Overall Tour of Austria
2003
 2nd National Time Trial Championships
 3rd Overall Tour du Poitou-Charentes
 3rd CSC Classic

References

1970 births
Living people
Danish male cyclists